Tyron Ivanof (born 17 July 1997) is a Belgian footballer who is currently unemployed after most recently playing for RWDM47  in the Belgian First Amateur Division as an attacking midfielder or winger.

Career

Club career
In 2009, Ivanof moved from the youth academy of Sint-Truidense to KRC Genk, where he ended up in the same age category as Leon Bailey, Bryan Heynen, Nordin Jackers and Dries Wouters, among others. However, Ivanof wasn't offered a professional contract by Genk, after which he moved to Lille OSC together with his brother Marvin in 2014. A year later he ended up at K.V. Kortrijk, where he signed his first professional contract two months before his twentieth birthday.

In the 2017/18 season, he was promoted in to the first team of Kortrijk. His debut in the Belgien First Division A came on 29 April 2017 in a game against KRC Genk, where he replaced Stijn De Smet in the 67th minute. The game finished 3–0. Partly due to a serious knee injury, he played only eleven official games for Kortrijk, including nine in Play-off games.

Ivanof moved to RWDM47 on 1 February 2020. He left the club at the end of the season.

References

External links

1997 births
Living people
Association football midfielders
Belgian footballers
Belgian expatriate footballers
Belgian Pro League players
Sint-Truidense V.V. players
K.R.C. Genk players
Lille OSC players
K.V. Kortrijk players
Belgian expatriate sportspeople in France
Expatriate footballers in France
RWDM47 players